KABAYAN Partylist, an abbreviation of Kabalikat ng Mamamayan, is a COMELEC-accredited party-list that represents marginalized sectors of the Filipino community, including the disabled, senior citizens, overseas Filipino workers (OFWs), fishermen, farmers, and the poor.

KABAYAN was founded by Ron Salo in 2009.

Political positions
KABAYAN's official website indicates that the group promotes the full realization of the economic, social and cultural rights of all Filipinos, particularly the marginalized. KABAYAN's core advocacies are summarized in the acronym "KABAYAN +2":

KAlusugan! (lit. Health): Government should uphold every person's right to health, and to the provision of accessible, quality, and compassionate health services. The party-list pursues legislation that shall ensure universal health insurance coverage, which shall ensure free medical services to the poor and underprivileged Filipinos.

PaBAhay! (lit. Housing): The party-list pursues legislation for the creation of a Department of Housing to assist homeless Filipinos through a comprehensive housing program that covers housing finance, rationale land use, and active community support to ensure affordable and decent shelter.

KabuhaYAN! (lit. Livelihood): The party-list promotes capability-building in cooperativism and micro-financing for micro, small and medium enterprises to benefit more families in every community.

"+2" refers to KABAYAN's advocacies in upholding the right to education of every Filipino, particularly the children; and supporting overseas Filipino workers. KABAYAN will work for enhanced policies and programs to address the distinctive needs of youth and students for quality education and training; and, for technical and financial assistance for OFWs to encourage entrepreneurship and homecoming.

Electoral history

2010 elections
KABAYAN party list lost in the 2010 elections after Ron Salo, the first nominee, only got 110,085 votes or 0.38%. It was Kabayan's first attempt to seek a congressional seat.

2016 elections
KABAYAN finished sixth out of a total 115 party-list groups that ran. After a vigorous campaign by the first nominee, they secured two seats for the partylist in the House of Representatives.

References

External links

Party-lists represented in the House of Representatives of the Philippines